Ansi City (Goguryeo: 安寸忽), also known as Ansi Fortress, was a Goguryeo fortified  city in present-day Liaoning province, China. The city was founded in early 4th century after Goguryeo conquered the area, and received its name from a Han dynasty prefecture of the same name. The ruins of the city are identified with a site at Yingchengzi,  to the southeast of Haicheng. Ansi was a major city of the Goguryeo and the scene of a major siege and battle between the Goguryeo and Tang dynasty China in 645 AD.

Siege of Ansi 

The Goguryeo controlled an area that covered the north part of the Korean Peninsula, most of Liaoyang and Jilin province in modern China and part of what is now Primorsky Krai in Russia. They neighboured Silla to the south and China to the west. In 643 AD, the Goguryeo attacked Silla who then appealed to the Chinese emperor for help. In response, Emperor Taizong of Tang sent an army to attack the Goguryeo in 645. This invasion was initially successful with the capture of Liaodong and Baicun Goguryeo cities by the Tang. Following this victory, there was discussion as to whether to march directly to Pyongyang, the Goguryeo capital city, or to face the Goguryeo army in the Liaodong region. After the battle of Mount Zhubi, the Goguryeo fell back on their city of Ansi and the Tang army pursued.

Emperor Taizong next prepared to put Ansi under siege, but he had reservations about it. When he discussed the matter with Li Shiji, he stated:

(The name of the defending general of Ansi has been lost to history, but is traditionally rendered in Korean popular accounts as Yang Manchun, even though some Korean historical sources indicated that the name was lost.)

Li Shiji disagreed, however, arguing that as Geonan was to Ansi's south and that the main Tang food supply was coming from Liaodong, that if he attacked Geonan first, the defenders of Ansi would try to cut his supply lines. Emperor Taizong agreed, and Li Shiji began to siege Ansi.

When Emperor Taizong and Li Shiji arrived at Ansi, it was said that the Ansi defenders, upon seeing the banner of the Tang emperor, began to yell insults from the walls.  Emperor Taizong was insulted, and Li Shiji received permission to slaughter the city's male inhabitants when it fell—which led to the Ansi defenders fighting even harder. Li Shiji was unable to capture the city for some time.  Go Yeonsu and Go Hyezin, who had by now accepted Tang titles, suggested:

Some other officials also suggested:

Emperor Taizong was inclined to accept these proposals, but Zhangsun opposed, stating:

Emperor Taizong agreed with Zhangsun and did not head toward Ogol.

As the siege continued, on an occasion, when Emperor Taizong heard the sounds of chickens and pigs coming out of the city, he opined to Li Shiji that it must be that the Goguryeo defenders were preparing an assault and were slaughtering animals beforehand to feast on them.  Li Shiji therefore prepared for a night assault, which came that very night.  Emperor Taizong himself led soldiers to repel the assault, and the Goguryeo forces withdrew within the city again.

Meanwhile, Li Daozong was building a dirt mound to the southeast of the city to use as an attack mechanism, and in response, the Ansi defenders added to the height of the wall to the southeast. This process continued for 60 days, and eventually, the dirt mound got so high that from it, one could easily see inside the city.  Li Daozong had his officer Fu Fu'ai take position on the dirt mound. Suddenly, the mound had a partial collapse and fell onto the city walls, and the walls collapsed as well.  At this moment, Fu, for reasons unexplained in history, left his position, and the Goguryeo forces took the opportunity to attack and capture the dirt mound, and instead used it as part of the defensive bulwarks.  Emperor Taizong, in anger, executed Fu in public and ordered a heavy assault on the dirt mound, but could not capture it within three days.  Li Daozong bared his feet and begged punishment, but Emperor Taizong pardoned him.

Meanwhile, winter was approaching, and the grass was drying up.  Also, the food supplies were running out.  On October 13, 645, Emperor Taizong ordered a withdrawal.  He gave a demonstration ceremony next to Ansi before withdrawing.

In popular culture
The 2018 South Korean film The Great Battle is based on the battle of Ansi Fortress in 645 AD.

References

Goguryeo
Buildings and structures in Liaoning